The 2021 Swiss Open Gstaad was a men's tennis tournament played on outdoor clay courts. It was the 53rd edition of the Swiss Open, and part of the ATP Tour 250 Series of the 2021 ATP Tour. It took place at the Roy Emerson Arena in Gstaad, Switzerland, from 19 July through 25 July 2021.

Champions

Singles 

  Casper Ruud def.  Hugo Gaston, 6–3, 6–2

Doubles 

  Marc-Andrea Hüsler /  Dominic Stricker def.  Szymon Walków /  Jan Zieliński, 6–1, 7–6(9–7)

Points and prize money

Point distribution

Prize money 

*per team

Singles main draw entrants

Seeds 

 1 Rankings are as of July 12, 2021

Other entrants
The following players received wildcards into the main draw:
  Johan Nikles
  Leandro Riedi
  Dominic Stricker

The following players received entry from the qualifying draw:
  Zizou Bergs
  Sandro Ehrat
  Vít Kopřiva
  Oscar Otte

The following players received entry as lucky losers:
  Enzo Couacaud
  Kacper Żuk

Withdrawals
Before the tournament
  Facundo Bagnis → replaced by  Juan Ignacio Londero
  Roberto Carballés Baena → replaced by  Tallon Griekspoor
  Federico Coria → replaced by  Hugo Gaston
  Norbert Gombos → replaced by  Dennis Novak
  Yannick Hanfmann → replaced by  Kacper Żuk
  Philipp Kohlschreiber → replaced by  Enzo Couacaud
  Kamil Majchrzak → replaced by  Marc-Andrea Hüsler
  Dominic Thiem → replaced by  Arthur Rinderknech
  Jo-Wilfried Tsonga → replaced by  Marc Polmans
  Fernando Verdasco → replaced by  Thiago Seyboth Wild

Retirements
  Tallon Griekspoor
  Marc-Andrea Hüsler

Doubles main draw entrants

Seeds

1 Rankings are as of 12 July 2021.

Other entrants
The following pairs received wildcards into the doubles main draw:
  Marc-Andrea Hüsler /  Dominic Stricker
  Jakub Paul /  Leandro Riedi

Withdrawals
Before the tournament
  Kamil Majchrzak /  Szymon Walków → replaced by  Szymon Walków /  Jan Zieliński
  Elias Ymer /  Mikael Ymer → replaced by  Dustin Brown /  Tristan-Samuel Weissborn
  Yannick Hanfmann /  Marc Polmans → replaced by  Zizou Bergs /  Tallon Griekspoor
During the tournament
  Zizou Bergs /  Tallon Griekspoor

Retirements
  Sander Arends /  David Pel

External links

References 

Swiss Open Gstaad
Swiss Open (tennis)
2021 in Swiss tennis
July 2021 sports events in Switzerland